Edward Fisher (1730–c.1785) was an Irish-born mezzotint engraver, mostly of portraits, working in London.

Life
Fisher was born in Ireland in 1730. He was originally a hatter, but then  took up engraving and  went to London. He became a member of the Incorporated Society of Artists in 1766, and exhibited there 
fourteen times between 1761 and 1776. His earliest dated print is 1758,  and his latest 1781. He was living in Leicester Square in 1761, and moved to Ludgate Street in 1778. It is said that Joshua Reynolds called him "injudiciously exact"  for finishing  the unimportant parts of his plate too highly.

He engraved more than sixty  portraits, including George, earl of Albemarle, after Reynolds : Robert Brown, after Mason Chamberlin; William Pitt, Earl of Chatham, after Richard Brompton; 
Colley Cibber, after Jean-Baptiste van Loo; Christian VII of Denmark, after Nathaniel Dance; David Garrick, after Reynolds; Simon, 
earl Harcourt, after Hunter; Roger Long, after Benjamin Wilson; Hugh, Earl of Northumberland, and Elizabeth, countess of Northumberland, after Reynolds; Paul Sandby, after Francis Cotes; Laurence Sterne, after Reynolds; and the following fancy subjects: Lady in Flowered Dress, after Hoare; Hope Nursing Love after Reynolds; his Heads from "Vicar of Wakefield, ten plates engraved from his own designs, were published in 1776.

After his death, in about 1785, most of his copper plates were dispersed among several print-sellers, and in some cases altered.

References

Sources

External links

1730 births
1785 deaths
18th-century engravers
Irish engravers